The Calcutta Symphony Orchestra is an orchestra that once existed in Calcutta, India. The last conductor of the orchestra was Bunny Jacob.

Francisco Casanovas also once conducted the orchestra and Yehudi Menuhin performed with it in 1952.

See also
Calcutta School of Music
Calcutta Chamber Orchestra

References

Symphony orchestras
Culture of Kolkata